There were five elections to the United States House of Representatives in 1983, during the 98th United States Congress.

List of elections 

Elections are listed by date and district.

|-
! 
| Phil Gramm
|  | Democratic
| 1978
|  | Incumbent resigned January 5, 1983, to run as a Republican.Incumbent re-elected February 12, 1983.Republican gain.
| nowrap | 

|-
! 
| Benjamin S. Rosenthal
|  | Democratic
| 1962 
|  | Incumbent died January 4, 1983.New member elected March 1, 1983.Democratic hold.
| nowrap | 

|-
! 
| colspan=3  | None (district created following the 1980 census)
|  | Representative-elect Jack Swigert (R) died December 27, 1982, of bone cancer.New member elected March 29, 1983.Republican gain.
| nowrap | 

|-
! 
| Phillip Burton
|  | Democratic
| 1964 
|  | Incumbent died April 10, 1983.New member elected June 21, 1983.Democratic hold.
| nowrap | 

|-
! 
| Harold Washington
|  | Democratic
| 1980
|  | Incumbent resigned April 30, 1983, to become Mayor of Chicago.New member elected August 23, 1983.Democratic hold.
| nowrap | 

|-
! 
| Larry McDonald
|  | Democratic
| 1974
|  | Incumbent died September 1, 1983, in the Korean Air Lines Flight 007.New member elected November 8, 1983.Democratic hold.
| nowrap | :''':

|}

References 

 
1983